K–12 is a 2019 American musical fantasy horror film written and directed by Melanie Martinez and co-directed by Alissa Torvinen. The film accompanies Martinez's second studio album of the same name and stars Martinez, Emma Harvey, Zión Moreno, Megan Gage, Zinnett Hendrix, Jesy McKinney, Marsalis Wilson, and Maggie Budzyna. The film follows Cry Baby (played by Martinez), a brave-hearted girl, and her charming best friend Angelita (Harvey), who make a bewitching pair as they embark on a mission to take down the oppressive schooling system of K–12.

K–12 was shown in select theaters for one day only on September 5, 2019, and was officially released on September 6, 2019, by Abramorama in North American territories and Atlantic Records internationally through YouTube. The film received favorable reviews from critics and fans alike, who praised its production values, themes, and songs, but criticism for its screenplay, acting and special effects.

Plot
Cry Baby prepares to attend K–12 Sleepaway School. While on the school bus with her best friend, Angelita, she is bullied by her schoolmates ("Wheels on the Bus"). When the bus loses control and plunges into water, Cry Baby and Angelita reveal supernatural abilities that allow them to lift the bus into the air and land outside of K–12.

During class, cruel, popular student Kelly grows jealous after seeing Cry Baby speak with Kelly’s boyfriend, Brendon, and threatens to attack Cry Baby. Cry Baby telephones her mother for advice, who doesn't respond due to being passed out drunk. Cry Baby imagines a conversation between her mother and deceased father. ("Class Fight"). During the fight, Cry Baby's powers are triggered, causing her and Kelly to levitate. Cry Baby strangles Kelly with her braids until Ms. Daphne intervenes, sending them to the principal's office.

Cry Baby discovers the principal is medicating students to control them. She poisons his drink, but he recovers promptly ("The Principal"). Some time later, Cry Baby arrives late to class and is turned into a marionette puppet ("Show & Tell"). She and Angelita are sent to the nurse’s office, where the nurses restrain and force medication upon them ("Nurse's Office"). They are saved by Lilith, an angelic spirit guide, who tells them they must stay in K–12, and that they are immortal beings. Later, Cry Baby and Angelita encounter a crowd of dancing ghosts in the school's ballroom, and run to class to escape them.

In drama class, CryBaby is cast as a housewife and requests to be assigned a different role, but is ridiculed ("Drama Club"). During the school play, Cry Baby urges the audience to wake from their brainwashed state, using her abilities to free them. She and Angelita lead the students to the principal's office, where they murder him. After burying the principal, Cry Baby and Angelita meet with Celeste, a friend with similar abilities. Placed atop a cake while topless, Cry Baby expresses her disdain for rape culture as boys steal and devour pieces against her will ("Strawberry Shortcake").

At lunch, Cry Baby befriends a girl named Magnolia ("Lunchbox Friends"). The group notices that Fleur, a friend of Kelly, also has their abilities. Cry Baby learns that Fleur is bulimic and offers her compassion, thus becoming her friend ("Orange Juice"). Cry Baby is sent to detention after Kelly snitches to Leo, the principal's son. Her powers weaken but she manipulates Leo into releasing her ("Detention").

The girls devise a plan to destroy the school, which Leo detects on security footage. Angelita and her biology teacher begin flirting. After class, he shrinks and tries to dissect her. Cry Baby uses her powers to return Angelita to her normal size, allowing her to kill him in revenge. ("Teacher's Pet"). Cry Baby expresses her desire for a partner who is loyal and accepting ("High School Sweethearts").

A boy named Ben prepares to ask Cry Baby to the school dance but Leo foils his plan by inviting her instead. At the dance, Leo announces his knowledge of the girls’ plan and locks the seniors inside, forcing them to dance ("Recess"). Cry Baby disguises herself as a woman named Lorelai, deceiving Leo and locking him inside a closet. She instructs the students to evacuate the school over the loudspeaker, all of whom flee except Kelly.

Cry Baby tries to escape when Ben approaches her, confessing his feelings for her. They blow a spit bubble, encapsulating the school. The two leap to safety as the bubble floats away, with Leo trapped inside. The girls watch below as the school explodes and Cry Baby kisses Ben on the cheek. Lilith reappears in the distance, and they all race towards her gate to return home. As the girls enter, Cry Baby glances back hesitantly.

Cast

 Melanie Martinez as Cry Baby
 Emma Harvey as Angelita
 Zión Moreno as Fleur
 Megan Gage as Celeste
 Zinnett Hendrix as Magnolia
 Jesy McKinney as Leo
 Marsalis Wilson as Ben
 Maggie Budzyna as Kelly
 Bence Balogh as Jason
 Vilmos Heim as Brendon
 Alissa Torvinen as Ghost Girl
 Kate O'Donnell as Ms. Harper
 Balázs Csémy as Dean
 Natalia Toth as Lucy
 Joel Francis-Williams as Henry
 Zacky Agama as Thomas
 Olga Kovács as Ms. Penelope
 Kimesha Campbell as Lilith
 Katie Sheridan as Lorelai
 Toby Edington as The Principal
 Anne Wittman as Ms. Daphne
 Scott Young as Mr. Cornwell
 Quei Tann
 Laurka Lanczki as Holly
 Ágota Dunai as Rachel
 Rebeka Peter as Chloe
 Genesis Ilada
 Samantha Lepre
 Kendy Cruz

Development
In a 2017 interview with Billboard, Martinez said that her then-untitled second studio album was finished and would be accompanied by a film that she was writing and directing and that it would be "all of the videos together of the next record, all thirteen, with dialogue and whatnot in between connecting all of them together." In a 2019 interview after the film's release, Martinez stated she wrote the film to portray school as "a condensed version of life." She drew from her own experiences of bullying to portray the bullying of which is seen in the film. She explains further on the film's bright and pastel colors contrasted with macabre and thought-provoking visuals and plot-lines in an interview with Alternative Press the same year, saying "It's necessary because it's just a reflection of life, and life has ups and downs, both light and dark aspects."

Production
The film's costume design was done by Martinez and Christina Flannery. It ended up being filmed on location in Budapest, Hungary over a span of 31 days, and at Eszterháza. On January 2, 2019, Martinez began editing the film. Martinez cited visual artists such as Mark Ryden, Nicoletta Ceccoli, and the 1988 surrealist Jan Švankmajer film Alice and pop surrealism as inspiration for the film's visuals.

Release
On May 15, 2019, a first teaser was released. On May 22, 2019, a second teaser was released. On May 29, 2019, a third teaser was released revealing the release date. On June 17, 2019, during the MTV Movie Awards, a TV spot was released, containing a snippet of the song "Nurse's Office". On July 23, 2019, the official trailer was released, with a snippet of "Show and Tell" at the end of it.

The film had its premiere in Los Angeles on September 3, 2019. Two days later, on September 5, 2019, it had its US-wide premiere in New York City at the AMC Empire 25, being shown in select theaters at the same time all around the country. It was officially released on September 6, 2019, through VOD, and saw a home video release in a DVD that is packaged with some releases of the CD of the album released the same day. Martinez also released the film on her YouTube channel for free, then briefly making it so only YouTube Premium members can watch it that way, before reverting it back to free. The release of the film on her YouTube channel was the #2 on Trending the day of its release.

Reception

Box office
K–12 grossed $303,230 domestically and an additional $56,147 from international territories, bringing its total worldwide gross to $359,377. It was the 6th highest grossing film domestically on the night of its theatrical release.

Critical reception
The film received generally positive, favorable reviews from Martinez's fans and critics alike. Alternative Press reviewed the film, commenting "[Martinez] presents a literal lesson on life... With Martinez, it comes in pastel pink and disguised by a bubble gum flavor, making it easy enough to accept while still getting the same expected results." io9 reviewed the film as well, stating that "When you listen to Melanie Martinez's K–12, the album's themes about bullying, insecurity, and the importance of learning to embrace one's imperfections are all readily apparent. But when you watch the accompanying K–12 film and visually drink in the story Martinez has created, it becomes a much more powerful fairytale about the lives we lead long after leaving school." Idolator also reviewed the movie, praising it for expanding the Cry Baby universe and for its messages, and saying "It can't be overstated what an epic achievement this is [for Martinez]."

Notes

References

External links
 

2019 films
2019 horror films
American dark fantasy films
American musical films
Films shot in Budapest
Films based on albums
2010s American films